USS C-2 (SS-13) was one of five C-class submarines built for the United States Navy in the first decade of the 20th century.

Description
The C-class submarines were enlarged versions of the preceding B class, the first American submarines with two propeller shafts. They displaced  on the surface and  submerged. The C-class boats had a crew of 1 officer and 14 enlisted men.

For surface running, they were powered by two  Craig gasoline engines, each driving one propeller shaft. When submerged each propeller was driven by a  electric motor. They could reach  on the surface and  underwater.

The boats were armed with two 18-inch (450 mm) torpedo tubes in the bow. They carried two reloads, for a total of four torpedoes.

Construction and career

C-2 was laid down by Fore River Shipbuilding Company in Quincy, Massachusetts – under a subcontract from Electric Boat Company – as USS Stingray. She was launched on 8 April 1909 sponsored by Ms. Elizabeth Stevens, and commissioned on 23 November 1909. She was renamed USS C-2 on 17 November 1911. C-2 – assigned to the Atlantic Torpedo Fleet and later the Atlantic Submarine Flotilla – cruised along the East Coast until 20 May 1913, when she cleared Norfolk, Virginia, for six months of operations from Guantánamo Bay, Cuba. In December, she reported at Cristóbal, Colón, Panama, and began an operating schedule of torpedo practice, exploration of anchorages, and harbor defense duty at ports of the Panama Canal Zone. During the latter part of World War I, C-2 patrolled the Florida coast. The submarine was placed in ordinary at Coco Solo, Canal Zone on 22 August 1919, and was decommissioned on 23 December 1919. She was sold for scrap on 13 April 1920.

Notes

References

External links

United States C-class submarines
World War I submarines of the United States
Ships built in Quincy, Massachusetts
1909 ships